Zastawie may refer to the following places:
Zastawie, Kuyavian-Pomeranian Voivodeship (north-central Poland)
Zastawie, Biłgoraj County in Lublin Voivodeship (east Poland)
Zastawie, Krasnystaw County in Lublin Voivodeship (east Poland)
Zastawie, Łuków County in Lublin Voivodeship (east Poland)
Zastawie, Puławy County in Lublin Voivodeship (east Poland)
Zastawie, Gmina Urszulin in Lublin Voivodeship (east Poland)
Zastawie, Gmina Wola Uhruska in Lublin Voivodeship (east Poland)
Zastawie, Masovian Voivodeship (east-central Poland)
Zastawie, Greater Poland Voivodeship (west-central Poland)
Zastawie, West Pomeranian Voivodeship (north-west Poland)